Howmeh-ye Gharbi Rural District may refer to:
 Howmeh-ye Gharbi Rural District (Dasht-e Azadegan County)
 Howmeh-ye Gharbi Rural District (Izeh County)
 Howmeh-ye Gharbi Rural District (Khorramshahr County)
 Howmeh-ye Gharbi Rural District (Ramhormoz County)